Tommy Bowles may refer to:
 Thomas Gibson Bowles (1841–1922), founder of the magazines The Lady and the English Vanity Fair
 Verdell Smith (born 1963), American boxer